Dieu merci! (Thank God!) is a French language Quebec television series based on the Australian series, Thank God You're Here. This version began on September 27, 2007, on TVA on Sundays at 7 pm, and differed from the original in that it used actors, singers and other artists.

During its fall upfronts, TVA announced the show as Thank God You're Here, indicating that the show's final title had not yet been decided.

External links
 Official website
 TVA calls Quebec's fall sked "utopia" for clients

2007 Canadian television series debuts
2000s Canadian reality television series
2010s Canadian reality television series
2012 Canadian television series endings 
TVA (Canadian TV network) original programming
Television series by Fremantle (company)
Television shows filmed in Quebec